Tony Skole (born September 26, 1968) is an American baseball coach and former third baseman, who is the current head baseball coach of The Citadel Bulldogs. He played college baseball and college football at The Citadel from 1988 to 1992. He previously served as head coach of the East Tennessee State Buccaneers (2000–2017).

Playing career
Skole played baseball and football at The Citadel Bulldogs, a key part of several memorable teams in both sports.  In baseball, he was part of the team that reached the 1990 College World Series and drove in the go-ahead run against Cal State Fullerton in the Bulldogs only win in Omaha.  He played for both Chal Port and Fred Jordan, whom he succeeded as head coach of the Bulldogs in 2017.  He was a starting Defensive Back on football teams that beat the University of South Carolina, the University of Arkansas and the United States Military Academy; the Bulldogs reached the Division I-AA playoffs twice, for the first time in school history.

Coaching career
On June 8, 2017, he was named the head baseball coach of The Citadel Bulldogs.

Head coaching record

See also
List of current NCAA Division I baseball coaches

References

External links
Tony Skole, Head Baseball Coach, The Citadel

1968 births
Living people
The Citadel Bulldogs baseball coaches
The Citadel Bulldogs baseball players
The Citadel Bulldogs football players
East Tennessee State Buccaneers baseball coaches
Lincoln Memorial Railsplitters baseball coaches